Just Stop Oil is an environmental activist group in the United Kingdom. Using civil resistance and direct action, the group aims for the British government to commit to halting new fossil fuel licensing and production. It launched on 14 February 2022 and held a month of oil terminal disruptions across Southern England in April 2022. The group has garnered criticism for their protest methods, which have included blocking roads and vandalism. According to the group, since 1 April 2022 its supporters have been arrested nearly 2,000 times.

Philosophy and views 
Just Stop Oil opposes the United Kingdom granting new fossil fuel licensing and production agreements; on its website it calls for the government of the United Kingdom to stop all future consents and licensing agreements related to the development, exploration, and production of fossil fuels in the country. The group demands investment in renewable energy, and that buildings have better thermal insulation  to avoid waste of energy.

In an interview with The Guardian, a Just Stop Oil organiser described the group as non-hierarchical, with activists in the group operating in autonomous blocs that share resources but have no formal leadership.

In October 2022, Just Stop Oil vowed to continue protesting as long as capital punishment is not imposed against them in response to a proposed update to the Public Order Act.

Protests

BAFTA disruption 
On 13 March 2022, supporters disrupted the 75th British Academy Film Awards (BAFTAs). They wore T-shirts with 'Just Stop Oil' written on them.

Attempted disruptions of football matches 
On 20 March 2022, two supporters attempted to disrupt a football match at Arsenal's Emirates Stadium in London, but were intercepted. On 21 March, one supporter stopped play at a football match at Goodison Park in Liverpool when he ran onto the pitch and cable tied himself to a goalpost by his neck. The following day, one supporter briefly made it onto the pitch at Molineux Stadium in Wolverhampton. On 24 March six supporters attempted to disrupt a match at the Tottenham Hotspur Stadium in north London. All were removed quickly, but the match was briefly stopped.

Oil company protests and sabotage 
Beginning 1 April 2022, they carried out England-wide blockades of 10 critical oil facilities, intending to cut off the supply of petrol to South East England. They claimed they were inspired by the UK lorry drivers' protests in 2000 that paralysed petrol distribution. On 14 April, Just Stop Oil activists stopped and surrounded an oil tanker in London, causing congestion on the M4 motorway. On 15 April, supporters targeted Kingsbury, Navigator and Grays oil terminals, blockading roads and climbing onto oil tankers. The same day it was reported that Navigator Thames, ExxonMobil, and Valero had secured civil injunctions to prevent protest at their oil terminals. On 19 April, Just Stop Oil suspended its actions against fuel distribution for a week in the hope of action from the government. On 28 April, about 35 Just Stop Oil supporters sabotaged petrol pumps at two M25 motorway service stations (Cobham services in Surrey and Clacket Lane services in Kent).

Attempted disruption of 2022 British Grand Prix 
On 3 July 2022 a group of Just Stop Oil supporters walked onto the track at the 2022 British Grand Prix after the race had been suspended due to a crash on the opening lap, and sat down on the tarmac. They were arrested by police. The protestors' cause was supported by the Formula One drivers Sergio Pérez, Lewis Hamilton, and Carlos Sainz, though their actions were not—all three drivers said that these people should not have put themselves at risk of physical harm. F1 president Stefano Domenicali also criticised the protesting method. Before the event, the Northamptonshire Police warned they had "creditable intelligence" that a group of protesters were planning to disrupt the race and potentially attempt a track invasion and that the protest would be related to environmental issues, but the warning did not mention Just Stop Oil by name.

July 2022 art gallery protests and vandalism 
Supporters of Just Stop Oil targeted artworks in public galleries in July 2022. Two supporters glued themselves to the frame of John Constable's 1821 painting The Hay Wain at the National Gallery in London on 4 July. They covered the painting with a printed illustration that reimagined The Hay Wain as an "apocalyptic vision of the future" that depicted "the climate collapse and what it will do to this landscape". The two people were subsequently arrested by police and the painting was removed for examination by conservators.

A group of supporters glued themselves to the frame of a copy of Leonardo da Vinci's The Last Supper painting at the Royal Academy of Arts on 5 July. 'No New Oil' was spray painted on a wall underneath the painting. In February 2023, these activists were fined £486 each for causing unintended criminal damage but found not guilty to a further charge of causing damage to a piece of furniture that they had not been near.

Two supporters glued themselves to the frame of Vincent van Gogh's Peach Trees in Blossom at the Courthald Institute of Art on 30 June 2022. Both were found guilty of causing criminal damage to the frame, one was jailed for three weeks and the other received a suspended sentence.

London petrol station blocks and vandalism 
On 26 August 2022, the group blocked seven petrol stations in Central London and vandalised pumps. Forty-three people around London were arrested on suspicion of criminal damage.

Late 2022 London protests and vandalism 
Around October 2022, Just Stop Oil started a months long protest in London. Throughout the period members blocked roads and bridges in London, including in Islington, Abbey Road, High Holborn/Kingsway, four bridges across the Thames, Westminster, as well as the M25 motorway. Just Stop Oil staged 32 days of disruption from the end of September and throughout October, which the Metropolitan Police said resulted in 677 arrests with 111 people charged.

On 14 October, two Just Stop Oil protesters, one being Phoebe Plummer and the other being Anna Holland, made a verbal statement, threw tomato soup at the fourth version of Vincent van Gogh's 1888 work The Arles Sunflowers, in the National Gallery, and then glued their hands to the wall below the painting. The painting was protected by glass and was not damaged; however the frame, itself of significant value, suffered some slight damage. The rotating sign outside Scotland Yard was also spray-painted orange. More than 20 arrests were made. The actions of the protesters were criticised from across the political spectrum. A witness said to The Guardian, "They may be trying to get people to think about the issues but all they end up doing is getting people really annoyed and angry." Emma Camp with Reason magazine reported that, "The protest was probably ineffective on its own terms too. Throwing a can of tomato soup at a precious work of art has little to do with fighting fossil fuels."  Vox noted that "...much of the media and public attention was negative, with many questioning the efficacy of the protest and criticizing the protesters for hurting their own cause." Others defended the actions of the protesters. Margaret Klein Salamon, executive director of the Climate Emergency Fund, an organisation that funds Just Stop Oil, said that the Sunflowers protest was the most successful action in the climate movement in 8 years as it had broken through "this really terrible media landscape where you have this mass delusion of normalcy".

On 17 October, two supporters scaled the Queen Elizabeth II Bridge, which connects the M25 between Essex and Kent, causing its closure. One of the climbers, Morgan Trowland, was a bridge design engineer from London. After 36 hours, the protesters agreed with police to leave the bridge, and were arrested. The bridge remained closed for another 6 hours.

Also on 17 October, the group spray-painted the exterior of an Aston Martin car showroom on Park Lane, London, prompting criticism from Richard Hammond. On 20 October, about 20 members spray-painted the exterior windows of Harrods in Knightsbridge, London. Two members of the group were arrested on suspicion of criminal damage. On 24 October, two Just Stop Oil protesters smeared cake on a waxwork of King Charles at Madame Tussauds. On 25 October, protesters sprayed paint on 55 Tufton Street, a building housing climate change denial thinktanks. On 26 October, police arrested more than a dozen activists who blocked Piccadilly in central London and spray-painted luxury car showrooms in nearby Mayfair.

On 31 October, activists targeted buildings used by the Home Office, MI5, the Bank of England and News Corp, spraying orange paint on each and demanding an end to new oil and gas licences. The targets were chosen because they represent "the four pillars that support and maintain the power of the fossil fuel economy", the group said. Six people were arrested by the Metropolitan Police.

On 7 November, multiple junctions of the M25 motorway were closed. On 11 November, the group announced it would pause its protests on the M25. In November 2022, Jan Goodey, 57, from Brighton, was jailed for six months after pleading guilty to intentionally or recklessly causing a public nuisance after taking part in this protest.

Dutch art protests and vandalism 
On 27 October, two protesters glued themselves to the surrounds of Girl with a Pearl Earring by Johannes Vermeer at Mauritshuis museum. The painting, protected by glass, was not damaged. The two were subsequently sentenced to two months in prison, with one month suspended, by a Dutch court.

Protesting methods 
Just Stop Oil says that it favors nonviolent direct action and civil resistance. The group follows an approach of general social disruption, similar to the methods of climate activist groups Extinction Rebellion and Insulate Britain, although Just Stop Oil differs in that its targets include cultural institutions.

The group has garnered criticism for their protest methods, such as blocking roads and vandalism.

In an October 2022 interview with Sky News, Just Stop Oil spokesperson Emma Brown stated that the group has a "blue light policy" to let emergency vehicles through traffic blocks created by protesters.

In December 2022, Metropolitan Police Commissioner Mark Rowley suggested that Just Stop Oil was being "much less assertive" in its protests following the arrests of some suspected leaders of the group.

Funding 
Just Stop Oil report that all their funding is through donations, with the group accepting the cryptocurrency Ethereum and more traditional fiat currencies. Their use of Ethereum was criticised by fellow environmentalists due to the large carbon footprint associated with cryptocurrencies. In September 2022, Ethereum reduced their environmental impact from around 8.5GW to less than 85MW through a software update.

In April 2022, it was reported that Just Stop Oil's primary source of funding was donations from the American-based Climate Emergency Fund. Through that fund, a notable donor to the group has been Aileen Getty, a descendant of the family which founded the Getty Oil company. In response, the Climate Emergency Fund stated that Getty did not work in the fossil fuel industry herself.

Arrest of journalists at protests 
As of November 2022, eight credentialled journalists have been arrested while covering Just Stop Oil protests. These include a reporter at LBC who was arrested and held in a cell for 5 hours; a documentary maker who was arrested and detained for 13 hours; and a photographer. Gillian Keegan, the education secretary responded to the arrests that "Journalists shouldn't get arrested for doing their job," and "We are defenders of free speech."

See also 
 Climate crisis
 Environmental direct action in the United Kingdom
 Extinction Rebellion
 Insulate Britain protests
 Public Order Bill

References

External links 
 

2022 establishments in the United Kingdom
Art crime
Climate change organisations based in the United Kingdom
Direct action
Environmental organisations based in the United Kingdom
Environmental protests in the United Kingdom
Nonviolent resistance movements
Organizations established in 2022
Radical environmentalism
Vandalism
Revolution